Selçuk Şahin (born 26 March 1983 in Munich, West Germany) is a Turkish footballer, who currently plays for Gümüşhanespor as a left back.

External links

1983 births
Living people
Turkish footballers
SSV Ulm 1846 players
Kartalspor footballers
Hacettepe S.K. footballers
Orduspor footballers
Süper Lig players
Adanaspor footballers
TFF First League players
Footballers from Munich
German people of Turkish descent
Association football fullbacks
Association football midfielders